Martin Donisthorpe Armstrong (2 October 1882 – 24 February 1974) was an English writer and poet, known for his stories.

Armstrong was born in Newcastle upon Tyne, and educated at Charterhouse and Pembroke College, Cambridge.

During World War I he volunteered with the British Army and served in France as a Private in the Artists' Rifles. He was commissioned into the 8th Battalion Middlesex Regiment, T.F. in 1915 and promoted to the rank of Lieutenant in 1916. He was included in the final Georgian Poetry anthology.

He married in 1929 Canadian writer Jessie McDonald after she had divorced Conrad Aiken, making Armstrong the stepfather of the young Joan Aiken. He appears in disguised form as a character in Conrad Aiken's Ushant.

Works
Exodus (1912) poems
Thirty New Poems (1918)
Lady Hester Stanhope (1920) biography
The Buzzards and Other Poems (1921)
The Puppet Show (1922) stories
Jeremy Taylor, A selection from his works (1923) editor
The Foster-Mother (n.d.)
The Bazaar and Other Stories (1924)
The Goat and Compasses (1925) novel
Desert, a Legend (1926) novel
The Stepson (1927) novel [published in the U.S. as The Water is Wide]
Sir Pompey and Madame Juno (1927) stories
Saint Hercules and Other Stories (1927), Paul Nash illustrator
St. Christopher's Day (1928) novel
Portrait of the Misses Harlowe (1928) story
The Three-Cornered Hat (1928) translation
Laughing (1928) essay
The Sleeping Fury (1929) novel
The Bird-catcher and other poems (1929)
The Fiery Dive and Other Stories (1929)
Adrian Glynde, A Novel (1930)
Collected Poems (1931)
Blind Man's Mark (1931)
The Paintbox, "How and Why" Series (1931)
The Romantic Adventures of Mr. Darby and of Sarah his Wife (1931) novel
The Fothergill Omnibus (1931) anthology
Lover's Leap (1932)
Fifty-four Conceits: A Collection of Epigrams and Epitaphs Serious and Comic (1933)
General Buntop's Miracle and Other Stories (1934)
The Major Pleasures of Life (1934) an Anthology selected and arranged by Armstrong
Venus Over Lannery (1936) novel
A Case of Conscience and Other Tales (1937)
Spanish Circus: Charles IV of Spain (1937)
The Snake in the Grass (1938) novel
Victorian Peepshow (1938) autobiography
Simplicity Jones and Other Stories (1940)
Chichester Concert (1944) ode
George Borrow (1950)
Selected Stories (1951)
The Crumb for the Bird (1970)

References

External links 
 
 
 
 

1882 births
1974 deaths
People educated at Charterhouse School
Alumni of Pembroke College, Cambridge
Artists' Rifles soldiers
Middlesex Regiment officers
British Army personnel of World War I
English male short story writers
English short story writers
English male poets
20th-century English poets
20th-century British short story writers
20th-century English male writers